Curtis Reed may refer to:

 Curtis Reed (Days of our Lives), a fictional character in the American soap opera Days of our Lives
 Curtis Reed (Home and Away), a fictional character in the Australian soap opera Home and Away
 Curtis Reed (politician) (1815–1895), American businessman and politician in Wisconsin